Kaynakköy can refer to:

 Kaynakköy, Çüngüş
 the Turkish name for Sychari